Gareth Drabble (born 6 July 1990 in Newcastle, England) is a former rugby union player who played for Leeds Carnegie in Premiership Rugby.

Gareth Drabble's position is openside flanker.

References
https://web.archive.org/web/20110713195518/http://www.leedscarnegie.com/rugby/leeds_carnegie_first_xv.php?player=95283&includeref=dynamic

1990 births
Living people
English rugby union players
Leeds Tykes players
Rugby union players from Newcastle upon Tyne
Rugby union flankers